Petrophile drummondii is a species of flowering plant in the family Proteaceae and is endemic to southwestern Western Australia. It is a shrub with rigid, pinnate leaves with needle-shaped, sharply-pointed pinnae, and spherical heads of hairy, fragrant, yellow flowers.

Description

Taxonomy
Petrophile drummondii was first formally described in 1845 by Carl Meissner in Johann Georg Christian Lehmann's book Plantae Preissianae from material collected by James Drummond near the Swan River in 1839. The specific epithet (drummondii) honours the collector of the type specimens.

Distribution and habitat
This petrophile grows in heath and shrubland and is scattered throughout the Avon Wheatbelt, Geraldton Sandplains, Jarrah Forest and Swan Coastal Plain biogeographic regions of southwestern Western Australia.

Conservation status
Petrophile drummondii is classified as "not threatened" by the Western Australian Government Department of Parks and Wildlife.

References

drummondii
Eudicots of Western Australia
Endemic flora of Western Australia
Plants described in 1845
Taxa named by Carl Meissner